There have been three United States Navy ships with variations of the name USS Wayne:

 , a cargo ship that saw service during World War I
 , an attack transport ship that saw service during World War II
Her keel was laid on 18 May 2007, christened 19 October 2008, and commissioned 10 October 2009

United States Navy ship names